"Take It Like A Man" is a song by Canadian electronic group Dragonette, released as the second single from their debut studio album, Galore (2007). It reached a peak position of number 112 on the UK Singles Chart.

Critical reception
Overall, the song received mostly positive reviews. Jonathan Keefe of Slant Magazine noted and complimented the song's complicated D/S dynamics, matched against a sugary, playful melody. Heather Pheres of AllMusic compared the song to previous works of Gwen Stefani, and new age rock band The Killers.

Music video
The music video, based on 1970s-era pornographic tropes, was directed by Ben Taylor, and premiered on Dragonette's official YouTube channel on June 26, 2007. Dragonette described the video as "very saucy".

Charts

Track listing

CD single
(Released )

Promo maxi

12" single

7" single
(Released )

References

External links
Dragonette official website

2007 singles
Dragonette songs
Mercury Records singles
2007 songs
Songs written by Martina Sorbara
Songs written by Dan Kurtz
Songs written by Steve Chrisanthou